The Oaks, also known as Innes Hill, is a historic home and farm located near Warrenton, Fauquier County, Virginia. The house was built between 1931 and 1933, and consists of a 1 to -story, five bay, Classical Revival style main block with a four-part plan. The attached sections are a one-story pantry and kitchen wing and garage attached by a four bay arcade. The main block features a prominent two-story, four-bay, pedimented portico has four extraordinary fluted Tower of the Winds columns. Also on the property are the contributing Italianate style brick stable (c. 1847); a brick smokehouse; and an agent's cottage, tile barn, corn house, spring house and summerhouse built between 1928 and 1930; garage with servants' quarters, greenhouse, log cabin, potato house, pump house, chicken house and field shed built between 1931 and 1945; the mansion landscape and scene of the 1881 duel; and a windmill. It was the site in September 1881, of the one of the last four duels in Virginia, prior to enactment of anti-duel legislation in 1882.

It was listed on the National Register of Historic Places in 2002.

References

Houses on the National Register of Historic Places in Virginia
Neoclassical architecture in Virginia
Houses completed in 1933
Houses in Fauquier County, Virginia
National Register of Historic Places in Fauquier County, Virginia